The Golden Passport: Harvard Business School, the Limits of Capitalism, and the Moral Failure of the MBA Elite is a 2017 history of the Harvard Business School and its influence, written by Duff McDonald and published by Harper Business.

Further reading

External links 

 

2017 non-fiction books
21st-century history books
American history books
English-language books
History books about education
HarperCollins books
Harvard Business School